Klaidas Metrikis (born 21 February 2000) is a Lithuanian basketball player for Labas Gas Prienai of the Lithuanian Basketball League (LKL). He is also alumni of  Vladas Knašius Basketball School

Youth Basketball

Klaidas joined Klaipėda's prestigious basketball academy VKKM at early age. With the academy 15-16 season the team became runner ups in U16 Lithuanian Championship MKL, while following season alongside Rokas Jokubaitis, Matas Vaitkus the team became Lithuanian U17 Champions.  That season Metrikis averaged 14.5 Points and 7.8 Rebounds. For two seasons including 15-16 and 16-17 he also competed at semi-pro level and represented Neptūnas-2 in 3rd Lithuanian Division  RKL where he averaged 12.5 Points and 4.1 Rebounds at his later season.

Professional career

Metrikis started his professional career signing with  Neptūnas Klaipėda in 2018 summer. His first two professional seasons he spent at reserve team  Neptūnas-Akvaservis, which competes at 2nd Lithuanian League  NKL. After impressive 2020-21 season with Neptūnas Akvaservis where he averaged 13.8 Points and 36.5% accuracy from three point line Klaidas gained a lot of media coverage. Few times he was named among top NKL young players and some notable european basketball teams and NCAA teams showed interest in him. However Metrikis decided to continue his career in his hometown, and in March he was invited to main Klaipėda's team  Neptūnas Klaipėda, where he debuted in Lithuanian's top division LKL and in 1 minute on court scored 4 points. Klaidas in his 20-21 seasoned gained coaches trust and averaged 12 minutes on court and 3.6 points.

National Team

Metrikis competed at FIBA Under-19 Basketball World Cup in 2019, resulting with  Lithuania U19 National Team at 4th Place, and averaged 10.4 PTS, 3.7 REB and 0.4 STL in 7 games. He also competed in FIBA Under-18 European Championship in 2018, resulting with  Lithuania U19 National Team at 5th Place and averaged 6.7 PTS, 3.0 REB and 1.3 STL in 7 games

References

2000 births
Living people
BC Neptūnas players
Lithuanian men's basketball players
Basketball players from Klaipėda